Panatang Makabanda is the 11th studio album released by the Filipino rock band Rivermaya on March 19, 2013 & also their 1st album since 2009.
This is the first album without the guitarist/lead vocalist Jason Fernandez and bassist Japs Sergio.

This is also the first album with drummer Ryan Peralta and the only album to feature vocalist/bassist Norby David prior to his departure in 2016.

Track listing

Personnel
Mark Escueta – lead vocals (tracks 2, 5, 6, 7), guitars, percussion, backing vocals
Mike Elgar – lead vocals (track 3, 4, 9, 11, 12), guitars, backing vocals
Norby David – lead vocals (tracks 1, 8, 10), bass, backing vocals
Ryan Peralta – drums, percussion & keyboards

Additional musician:
Gloc 9 – rap (track 7)

Album credits 
Executive Producer: Kathleen Dy-Go
Produced By: Rivermaya
All Tracks mixed by Angee Rozul except Track 1 Mixed By Shinji Tanaka at Sound Creative Studios and Track 6 Mixed By Mark Escueta At The Birdhouse
Mastered By Angee Rozul
Album Concept And Layout By: Jay Saturnino Lumboy
Photography By: Niko Villegas Of Edge Of Light Studios
Additional Photos By: Jay Saturnino Lumboy
Styling By: Angelo Ramirez De Cartagena
Make Up: Amanda Padilla

References

Rivermaya albums